St. Stephen-Milltown was a provincial electoral district in New Brunswick. It was created from the multi-member riding of Charlotte in the 1973 electoral redistribution, and was abolished in the 1994 electoral redistribution. This riding was briefly separated from the multi-member riding of Charlotte from 1924 until 1926.

Members of the Legislative Assembly

Election results

1973–1994

1924–1926

External links
Website of the Legislative Assembly of New Brunswick

Former provincial electoral districts of New Brunswick